Asle Amundsen (born 27 June 1952) is a Norwegian politician for the Socialist Left Party.

He served as a deputy representative to the Parliament of Norway from Nordland during the term 1985–1989. He met during 32 days of parliamentary session. The first deputy of Hanna Kvanmo, he worked as a farmer in Andøy outside of politics.

References 

1952 births
Living people
People from Andøy
Socialist Left Party (Norway) politicians
Deputy members of the Storting
Nordland politicians
Norwegian farmers